Willard Palmer Harris (October 28, 1916 – August 21, 1973) was an American jazz trombonist.

Biography
Harris was born in Philadelphia, Pennsylvania, United States. Early in his career, Harris performed with Benny Goodman, Charlie Barnet, and Eddie Condon. He is remembered for his broad, thick tone and quick vibrato, that remained for the duration of each tone. He joined Woody Herman's First Herd in 1944. He was also in the Four Brothers Second Herd during the late 1940s, and he worked with Herman again in the 1950s. He then teamed up with Charlie Ventura and later with Chubby Jackson. Together with Flip Phillips, he became a stalwart of Benny Goodman's group in 1959, although it has been said that Goodman was frequently irritated at Harris because of Harris' indifferent approach to "sight-reading," the skill of playing previously unseen written music with fluency, an ability which Goodman and trumpeter Harry James both possessed. As an improviser, Harris seemed comfortable playing among divergent stylists, as shown on Jazz at the Philharmonic recordings, as his "one-off" style seemed to work in any context, from Dixieland, to swing, or bebop.

His solo on "Bijou" with Herman remains a classic, while his idiosyncratic treatment of the ballad, "Everything Happens to Me", is known for its vocality, and his treatment of the ballad "Everywhere" was inspiration for Roswell Rudd's free-contrapuntal "Everywhere." Later, Harris worked in Las Vegas, Nevada, finally retiring to Florida.

Harris died in Hallandale, Florida, in August 1973, at the age of 56.

Discography

As leader
 Bill Harris Herd (Norgran, 1956)
 Bill Harris and Friends (Fantasy, 1957) – with Ben Webster
 Live at the 3 Deuces! – with Charlie Ventura (Phoenix Jazz, 1975)
 Aces at the Deuces – with Charlie Ventura (Phoenix Jazz, 1976)

As sideman
With Woody Herman
 Blues Groove (Capitol, 1956)
 Songs for Hip Lovers (Verve, 1957)
 Woody Herman and His Orchestra '58 Featuring the Preacher (Columbia, 1958)

With Charlie Ventura
 Jumping with Ventura (EmArcy, 1955)
 Carnegie Hall Concert (Columbia, 1956)
 East of Suez (Regent, 1958)

With others
 Ralph Burns, Ralph Burns Among the JATPs (Norgran, 1955)
 Benny Carter, Benny Carter Plays Pretty (Norgran, 1954)
 Benny Carter, New Jazz Sounds (Norgran, 1955)
 Lionel Hampton, The Great Hamp and Little T (Coral, 1963)
 Chubby Jackson, Chubby's Back! (Argo, 1957)
 Chubby Jackson, I'm Entitled to You!! (Argo, 1958)
 Gene Krupa, The Exciting Gene Krupa (Verve, 1965)
 Anita O'Day, Anita O'Day Sings Jazz (Norgran, 1955)
 Charlie Parker, Big Band (Clef, 1954)
 Nat Pierce, Kansas City Memories (Coral, 1957)
 Flip Phillips, Flip Wails (Clef, 1956)
 Charlie Teagarden, The Big Horn of Little T (Coral, 1962)

References

External links
 
 Article at Online Trombone Journal 

1916 births
1973 deaths
American jazz trombonists
Male trombonists
Capitol Records artists
Musicians from Philadelphia
20th-century American musicians
20th-century trombonists
People from Hallandale Beach, Florida
Jazz musicians from Pennsylvania
20th-century American male musicians
American male jazz musicians
Savoy Records artists
Fantasy Records artists
Mercury Records artists